Two warships of Japan have been named Noshiro:

 , an  launched in 1942 and sunk in 1944
 , a  launched in 1976 and stricken in 2003
 , a Mogami-class frigate launched in 2021.

Japanese Navy ship names